Gutta is an Indian surname. Notable people with the surname include:

Jwala Gutta (born 1983), Indian badminton player
Vijaya Bapineedu (Gutta Bapineedu Chowdary, 1936–2019), Indian magazine editor, screenwriter, and film director

Indian surnames